Edwin Johannes Benne (born 21 April 1965, in Amersfoort) is a retired volleyball player from the Netherlands, who represented his native country at two consecutive Summer Olympics, starting in 1988. He ended up in fifth place at the 1988 Summer Olympics, followed by the silver medal four years later in Barcelona.
His international career spanned nine years, ending in 1993. During this time he received 382 caps, and represented his country in two Olympic Games.
Benne started his current position of head coach of the Dutch national team in 2011 leading them to a win at the 2012 European League and qualification to the 2013 World League.

References
  Dutch Olympic Committee

1965 births
Living people
Dutch men's volleyball players
Volleyball players at the 1988 Summer Olympics
Volleyball players at the 1992 Summer Olympics
Olympic silver medalists for the Netherlands
Olympic volleyball players of the Netherlands
Sportspeople from Amersfoort
Olympic medalists in volleyball

Medalists at the 1992 Summer Olympics
20th-century Dutch people
21st-century Dutch people